NBL1 North, formerly the Queensland Basketball League (QBL), is a semi-professional basketball league in Queensland and Northern Territory, Australia, comprising both a men's and women's competition. In 2020, Basketball Queensland partnered with the National Basketball League (NBL) to bring NBL1 to Queensland. NBL1 replaced the former QBL to create more professional pathways and opportunities for males and females playing basketball in Queensland. As a result, the QBL became the north conference of NBL1. In 2022, the league will expanded into the Northern Territory with a club from Darwin.

History
The league was formed in 1986 as the Queensland State Basketball League. In 1994, the league merged with the South and East conferences of the Continental Basketball Association (CBA) to form a North conference. 1998 saw further CBA expansion with the inclusion of a Central Conference from South Australia. The CBA was renamed the Australian Basketball Association (ABA) for the 1999 season and later added the Big V and the Waratah League for a total of six conferences. As a member of the ABA, the league took on the name of Queensland Australian Basketball League (QABL) in the early 2000s and set up a division system to separate the north and south teams within the state. The Sunstate (North Queensland) and Southern Cross (South Queensland) divisions were a big part of the league for a number of years, remaining in tacked up until the 2006 season. Following the 2006 season, the QABL restructured the competition, which saw the two divisions combining to have a statewide league of only one division for the 2007 season. In 2009, the QABL became known as the QBL following the demise of the Australian Basketball Association.

In October 2019, Basketball Queensland and the National Basketball League (NBL) announced a new partnership to bring NBL1 to Queensland in 2020, with NBL1 replacing the QBL. On 15 January 2020, the QBL was officially renamed NBL1 North and became the north conference of NBL1. However, due to the coronavirus pandemic, the 2020 season was cancelled.

For the 2022 season, the NBL1 North had a club from Darwin – the Darwin Salties – represented for the first time under the joint management of Darwin Basketball Association (DBA) and Basketball Northern Territory (BNT). It saw the NBL1 become the first Australian sport league to have clubs based in and playing out of every state and territory in Australia.

Current clubs

*Teams that transferred from QBL.

List of Champions

References

External links

 
NBL1
Queensland Basketball League
Basketball in Queensland
Queens
Sports leagues established in 1986
1986 establishments in Australia